Umbilical cord tomb of Taejo (태조대왕태실, 太祖大王胎室) are buried as umbilical cords of Taejo of Joseon and his son Jeongjong's located in Maninsan, Geumsan, South Chungcheong province, Korea.

Burial monuments and structures